Mary Matsuda Gruenewald (January 23, 1925 – February 11, 2021) was an American writer. She is best known for her autobiographical novel Looking Like the Enemy: My Story of Imprisonment in Japanese American Internment Camps, which details her own experiences as a Japanese American in World War II internment camps.

Biography

Early life

Gruenewald was born in 1925 in Washington to Heisuke and Mitsuno Matsuda, Japanese immigrants and farmers. She and her brother grew up in the small community of Vashon Island under idyllic circumstances. Her family owned a strawberry farm and attended a local Methodist congregation.

Internment experience

Upon learning about the Attack on Pearl Harbor in December 1941, her family destroyed their Japanese possessions.

In May 1942, following the signing of Executive Order 9066, she and her family were forced from their home and placed in a series of camps, starting with Pinedale Assembly Center and progressing through Tule Lake and Heart Mountain. She graduated from high school during camp. In September 1944, after transferring her parents to Minidoka to be closer to friends from Washington state, she left to join the Cadet Nurse Corps in Clinton, Iowa.

Postwar life

After the war, Gruenewald lived in Seattle and worked in the nursing field. She met and married Charles Gruenewald, a minister, in 1951. By 1970, she had become the nurse manager of the Emergency Room of the Group Health Cooperative Hospital in Seattle.

During the post-war years, she was initially reticent to discuss or write stories about her wartime experiences. However, in 1999, she decided to write down her experiences, primarily so that her children would know the details of her experience. These were published in 2005 as Looking Like the Enemy: My Story of Imprisonment in Japanese American Internment Camps. Gruenewald was 80 years old at the time.

Later years and death
In 2017, she received a diploma from Vashon Island High School, which she had attended prior to being interned.

Gruenewald died from non-COVID related pneumonia in February 2021.

List of works
 Looking Like the Enemy: My Story of Imprisonment in Japanese American Internment Camps (2005)
 Becoming Mama-San: 80 Years of Wisdom (2012)

References

1925 births
2021 deaths
20th-century American memoirists
Japanese-American internees
American writers of Japanese descent
20th-century American women writers
American autobiographers
American women memoirists
People from Vashon, Washington
American women nurses
21st-century American women
American women writers of Asian descent